The 2017 Karshi Challenger was a professional tennis tournament played on hard courts. It was the eleventh edition of the tournament which was part of the 2017 ATP Challenger Tour. It took place in Qarshi, Uzbekistan between 8 and 13 May 2017.

Singles main-draw entrants

Seeds

 1 Rankings as of May 1, 2017.

Other entrants
The following players received wildcards into the singles main draw:
  Farrukh Dustov
  Sanjar Fayziev
  Temur Ismailov
  Jurabek Karimov

The following players received entry from the qualifying draw:
  Vladimir Ivanov
  Vitaly Kozyukov
  Denys Molchanov
  Evgenii Tiurnev

Champions

Singles

  Egor Gerasimov def.  Cem İlkel 6–3, 7–6(7–4).

Doubles

  Denys Molchanov /  Sergiy Stakhovsky def.  Kevin Krawietz /  Adrián Menéndez Maceiras 6–4, 7–6(9–7).

References

Karshi Challenger
Karshi Challenger